The Government of South Russia was a White movement government established in Sevastopol, Crimea in April 1920.

It was the successor to General Anton Denikin's South Russian Government (Южнорусское Правительство Yuzhnorusskoye Pravitel'stvo) set up in February 1920.

General Pyotr Wrangel was the pravitel' (правитель, "ruler")  while the head of the government itself was the Chairman of the Council of Ministers, Alexander Krivoshein, with Peter Berngardovich Struve serving as foreign minister.  The government officially adopted the name "Government of South Russia" on 16 August 1920, and it controlled the area of the former Russian Empire's Taurida Governorate, i.e., the Crimean Peninsula and adjacent areas of the mainland.

The Government of South Russia received assistance from the Allied Powers including France (which recognized it in August 1920) and the United States, as well as from the newly independent Poland. However, foreign support gradually dried up so offensives of the former Armed Forces of South Russia and the Volunteer Army, now called the Russian Army, had failed in Northern Taurida.

In early November with the Perekop–Chongar operation, the Bolsheviks won decisive victories and entered Crimea proper.  Between 7 and 17 November it broke through Russian Army defenses on the Isthmus of Perekop, crossing the Sivash and capturing the Lithuanian Peninsula, the fortified , Yushun, and Chongar positions.  After breaking through at Perekop, the front advanced into Crimea.  Wrangel initiated an evacuation of 146,000 people to Constantinople with the last boats departing on 16 November.  With this withdrawal, the final remnants of the White forces in European Russia were defeated.

References

External links 
 1920-08-11 - Chronicling America - De-facto recognition of the Government of South Russia at the Library of Congress.
 1920-08-11 - Photo of the Government of South Russia at the encri.ru historical wiki.
 Search Russia Government at russia.search-government.com.

1920 disestablishments in Europe
Post–Russian Empire states
Former unrecognized countries
States and territories established in 1920
1920 in Ukraine
Political history of Sevastopol
White movement
Political history of Crimea